Michael Ray is the debut studio album by the American country music artist of the same name, and his second overall. It was released on August 7, 2015 via Atlantic Nashville. The lead single, "Kiss You in the Morning", was a number one hit on the US Billboard Country Airplay chart.

Content
Ray has writing credits on only one song on his debut, "Run Away with You", which he co-wrote with John Rich who first recorded the song as part of Big & Rich for their 2014 album, Gravity. Their version was released as a single on January 19, 2015 and was a Top 20 hit on the Country Airplay charts.

Track listing

Personnel
 Dave Cohen – Hammond B-3 organ, piano
 Perry Coleman – background vocals
 Charlie Judge – Hammond B-3 organ, piano
 Troy Lancaster – electric guitar
 Tony Lucido – bass guitar
 Jerry McPherson – electric guitar
 Russ Pahl – pedal steel guitar
 Danny Rader – acoustic guitar, banjo
 Michael Ray – lead vocals
 Mike Rojas – Hammond B-3 organ, piano
 Adam Shoenfeld – electric guitar
 Nir Z. – drums, percussion

Chart performance
The album debuted on the Billboard 200 at No. 21, and the Top Country Albums chart at No. 4, with 11,300 copies sold in the US in its first week.  The album has sold 51,000 copies in the US as of January 2017.

Album

Singles

References

2015 debut albums
Michael Ray (singer) albums
Atlantic Records albums
Albums produced by Scott Hendricks